The 1909 Iowa State Normals football team represented Iowa State Normal School (later renamed University of Northern Iowa) as an independent during the 1909 college football season. In its second and final season under head coach Clayton B. Simmons, the team compiled a 6–0 record, shut out four of six opponents, and outscored all opponents by a total of 131 to 32.

Schedule

References

Iowa State Normals
Northern Iowa Panthers football seasons
College football undefeated seasons
Iowa State Normals football